Yousif Nizar Saleh (born November 7, 1994 in Kuwait City) is a professional squash player who represents Kuwait. He reached a career-high world ranking of World No. 129 in May, 2013.

References

External links 
 
 

Kuwaiti squash players
Sportspeople from Kuwait City
Living people
1994 births
Competitors at the 2013 World Games